Suntali is a 2014 Nepali black-comedy film, directed by Bhaskar Dhungana. The film is produced by Bhaskar Dhungana, Jaya Shah, and Prachanda Shrestha under the banner of Blue Poppy Films. It stars Priyanka Karki, Karma Shakya, Sushma Karki, Bipin Karki, and Pramod Agrahari. The film follows Suntali's relationship with Sundar.

Plot 
A matriarch of a village in Nepal, is arranging his son Sundar's wedding. Suntali, Sundar's old friend, comes to the village, and she rekindle their relationship. The matriarch starts to plans to destroy her.

Cast 
 Priyanka Karki as Suntali
 Karma Shakya as Sundar
 Sushma Karki as Buxom Babe
 Bipin Karki as Bidur
 Pramod Agrahari as Bajrang
 Madan Krishna Shrestha as narrator

Release and reception 
Suntali premiered at the 19th Busan International Film Festival in October 2014 on the Window on Asian Cinema category.

Abhimanyu Dixit of The Kathmandu Post wrote, "Dhungana proved that he was a proficient maker that too in his debut film". Sophia Pande of Nepali Times wrote, "Suntali is quite the pleasure for those of us who have cringed in the theaters while watching Nepali films in the past". Niranjan Kunwar of The Record wrote "Suntali is a simple, yet beautiful film. And it's the simplest beauty that can be the most powerful". The staff of Onlinekhabar wrote, "True to its form, Suntali combined these two to a certain degree of success. But the audience couldn't warm up to this as most failed to recognise the clever juxtaposition of these forms".

Awards and nominations

References

External links 
 

2014 films
Nepalese comedy films
2010s Nepali-language films